The Robert Kirkpatrick Round Barn is a historic building located near Coggon in rural Delaware County, Iowa, United States. It was built in 1919 by Robert Kirkpatrick on his own farm. The building is a true round barn that measures  in diameter. The barn is constructed of clay tiles and features a two-pitch roof with a large hay dormer on the east side and two smaller dormers on the west and north. It is one of 16 clay tile barns that were based on a design from the Johnson Brothers Clay Works in Fort Dodge, Iowa. The use of hollow clay tile is a distinctive trait in the construction of Iowa's round barns. For many years it was used as a dairy barn before becoming a horse barn. It has been listed on the National Register of Historic Places since 2005.

References

Infrastructure completed in 1919
Buildings and structures in Delaware County, Iowa
National Register of Historic Places in Delaware County, Iowa
Barns on the National Register of Historic Places in Iowa
Round barns in Iowa